A west wind is a wind that originates in the west and blows east.

West Wind may also refer to:
"West Wind", a song by Miriam Makeba from The Magnificent Miriam Makeba
 East Wind: West Wind, an American novel
 West Wind Aviation, Saskatchewan's second-largest commercial aviation group
 Project West Wind, a wind farm west of Wellington, New Zealand

See also

 The West Wind (disambiguation)
 West Wind Shores
 West Wing
 Westwind (disambiguation)